The Mantell Screes are a rock spur rising to about  and bounded by screes (taluses), located northwest of Arkell Cirque on the north side of the Read Mountains, Shackleton Range, Antarctica. The feature was photographed from the air by the U.S. Navy, 1967, and surveyed by the British Antarctic Survey, 1968–71. In association with the names of geologists grouped in this area, it was named by the UK Antarctic Place-Names Committee in 1971 after English surgeon and geologist Gideon A. Mantell, known for his discovery of the iguanodon and three other fossil reptiles.

References

Ridges of Coats Land